Hiatavolva is a genus of predatory sea snails, marine gastropod mollusks in the family Ovulidae.

Species 
Species within the genus Hiatavolva include:
Hiatavolva coarctata (Sowerby in A. Adams & Reeve, 1848)
Hiatavolva depressa (Sowerby, 1889)
Hiatavolva rugosa Cate & Azuma in Cate, 1973

References

Ovulidae